Sulaiman Al-Maghni (Arabic:سليمان المغني) (born 15 January 1982) is an Emirati footballer. He currently plays as a midfielder .

References

External links
 

Emirati footballers
1982 births
Living people
Sharjah FC players
Al-Ittihad Kalba SC players
Association football midfielders
UAE First Division League players
UAE Pro League players